TJHS may refer to:
 Texas Jewish Historical Society
 Thomas Jefferson High School (disambiguation)
 Thompson Junior High School, Oswego, Illinois, United States